Jędrzej Jędrych (born 11 August 1967 in Kolbuszowa) is a Polish politician. He was elected to Sejm on 25 September 2005, getting 13791 votes in 29 Gliwice district as a candidate from Law and Justice list.

See also
Members of Polish Sejm 2005-2007

External links
Jędrzej Jędrych - parliamentary page - includes declarations of interest, voting record, and transcripts of speeches.

1967 births
Living people
People from Kolbuszowa
Movement for Reconstruction of Poland politicians
Law and Justice politicians
Members of the Polish Sejm 2005–2007